The second cabinet of Lascăr Catargiu was the government of Romania from 11 March 1871 to 30 March 1876.

Ministers
The ministers of the cabinet were as follows:

President of the Council of Ministers:
Lascăr Catargiu (11 March 1871 - 30 March 1876)
Minister of the Interior: 
Lascăr Catargiu (11 March 1871 - 30 March 1876)
Minister of Foreign Affairs: 
Gheorghe Costaforu (11 March 1871 - 27 April 1873)
(interim) Lascăr Catargiu (27 - 28 April 1873)
Vasile Boerescu (28 April 1873 - 7 November 1875)
(interim) Lascăr Catargiu (7 November 1875 - 30 January 1876)
Ion Bălăceanu (30 January - 30 March 1876)
Minister of Finance:
Petre Mavrogheni (11 March 1871 - 7 January 1875)
George Gr. Cantacuzino (7 January 1875 - 30 January 1876)
Ion Strat (30 January - 30 March 1876)
Minister of Justice:
Nicolae Crețulescu (11 March 1871 - 28 October 1872)
Manolache Costache Epureanu (28 October 1872 - 31 March 1873)
(interim) Gen. Christian Tell (31 March - 25 October 1873)
Alexandru N. Lahovari (25 October 1873 - 30 March 1876)
Minister of War:
Gen. Christian Tell (11 - 14 March 1871)
Gen. Ioan Em. Florescu (14 March 1871 - 30 March 1876)
Minister of Religious Affairs and Public Instruction:
(interim) Gheorghe Costaforu (11 - 14 March 1871)
Gen. Christian Tell (14 March 1871 - 9 January 1874)
(interim) Vasile Boerescu (9 January - 7 April 1874)
Titu Maiorescu (7 April 1874 - 30 January 1876)
Petre P. Carp (30 January - 30 March 1876)
Minister of Public Works:
(interim) Nicolae Crețulescu (11 March - 8 June 1871)
Nicolae Crețulescu (8 June 1871 - 16 December 1873)
George Gr. Cantacuzino (16 December 1873 - 7 January 1875)
Theodor Rosetti (7 January 1875 - 31 March 1876)
(interim) Alexandru N. Lahovari (31 March - 4 April 1876)

References

Cabinets of Romania
Cabinets established in 1871
Cabinets disestablished in 1876
1871 establishments in Romania
1876 disestablishments in Romania